George Washington Cate (September 17, 1825 – March 7, 1905) was an American lawyer and politician who served as a member of the United States House of Representatives for Wisconsin's 8th congressional district in the Forty-fourth Congress. He also served two terms in the Wisconsin State Assembly and 21 years as a Wisconsin Circuit Court judge.

Biography
Born in Montpelier, Vermont, Cate attended the common schools.  He studied law and was admitted to the bar at Montpelier in April 1844.  He moved to Wisconsin Territory in 1845 and supported himself in the lumber industry until he began the practice of law in Plover, in Portage County, on January 1, 1848. He served as Deputy Postmaster, Register of Deeds, and Clerk to the Board of Supervisors that year. In 1849, he was elected District Attorney and served for two terms. He moved to Stevens Point, Wisconsin, in 1852, where he opened a law office. He served as member of the Wisconsin State Assembly in 1852 and 1853.

Cate was elected Wisconsin Circuit Court judge of the 7th judicial circuit in April 1854, defeating former Whig state senator James S. Alban.  He was re-elected in 1860, 1866, and 1872.  In 1874, he was a candidate for the United States House of Representatives, running as a Liberal Reformer. Democratic canvassers committed fraud to secure his election, though Judge Cate was not implicated in this act. His opponent, Dr. Alexander S. McDill, challenged the results, but died before the court could determine that he had been the victor.  Thus Judge Cate was allowed to take office for the Forty-fourth Congress (March 4, 1875 – March 4, 1877). While in office, he represented Wisconsin's 8th congressional district. He was an unsuccessful candidate for reelection in 1876.

He resumed the practice of law in Stevens Point, Wisconsin, and died there March 7, 1905.  He is interred in Forest Cemetery, Stevens Point, Wisconsin.

Family

On October 24, 1851, George W. Cate married Levara Serena Brown (1836–1916). They raised eight children: Albert George Cate (1851–1933), Lynn Boyd Cate (1854–1937), Ida Levara Cate (1856–1866), Annie Serena Cate (1859–1881), Carrie Levara Cate (1864–1944) married William Jerome Cronyn, M.D., LL.B., who helped to establish Marquette University, Henry Brown Cate (1870–1956), Ruth Gray Cate (1874–1955), Georgeana Cate (1879–1949) married Gerhard Melvin Dahl, J.D., who was Vice President of Chase National Bank from 1917 to 1923 and then chairman of the Brooklyn Manhattan Transit Corp. in New York City from 1923 to 1943.

Electoral history

| colspan="6" style="text-align:center;background-color: #e9e9e9;"| General Election, November 3, 1874

| colspan="6" style="text-align:center;background-color: #e9e9e9;"| General Election, November 7, 1876

References

Sources

1825 births
1905 deaths
People from Montpelier, Vermont
People from Stevens Point, Wisconsin
Wisconsin state court judges
Democratic Party members of the Wisconsin State Assembly
Democratic Party members of the United States House of Representatives from Wisconsin
19th-century American politicians
19th-century American judges